Interlaken is a town in Switzerland between Lake Brienz and Lake Thun.  Interlaken, Interlachen or Interlochen may also refer to:


Places

Australia
 Interlaken, Tasmania, a locality in central Tasmania
 Interlaken Lakeside Reserve, a wetland on the Lake Crescent shore of the Interlaken isthmus in Interlaken, Tasmania

United States
 Interlachen, Florida, a town in Putnam County
 Interlachen, Oregon, a settlement in Multnomah County, near Fairview
 Interlaken, California, a town in Santa Cruz County
 Interlaken, New Jersey, a borough in Monmouth County
 Interlaken, New York, a village in the Finger Lakes Region
 Interlaken, Utah, a town in Wasatch County
 Interlochen, Michigan, a settlement in Grand Traverse County
 Interlochen Center for the Arts in Interlochen, Michigan
 Interlochen State Park, Michigan's first state park, in Interlochen
 Interlachen Country Club, a country club in Edina, Minnesota
 Camp Interlaken JCC, a summer camp in Eagle River, Wisconsin
 Interlaken Park (Seattle), a park in the North Capitol Hill neighborhood of Seattle, Washington
 Lake Innisfree, also known as Interlaken, a lake in New Rochelle, New York

Other uses
 Interlaken (networking), a high-speed serial interconnect protocol
 Interlaken, a variety of seedless grape